Imaginary Places is a single by American rapper Busdriver from his album Temporary Forever. It was released in 2002.

Song information
The title track "Imaginary Places" is sampled from "Badinerie" from Johann Sebastian Bach's "Minuet and Badinerie Orchestral Suite No. 2 in B Minor" and the theme from Paganini's 5th Caprice. It is featured in the video game Tony Hawk's Underground. It is also featured in the viral video "CSS : phoon too much for zblock bunnyhop fragmovie" The song also appeared in The Proud Family: Louder and Prouder episode "Home School."

"Jazz Fingers" features Aceyalone on vocals.

Track listing
Imaginary Places (produced by Paris Zax)
Mindcrossings (produced by Daddy Kev)
Jazz Fingers (produced by Omid)

References

2002 singles
2002 songs